Egbert R. Lachaert (born 4 July 1977, in Ghent) is a Belgian lawyer, politician and party chairman of the Open VLD.

Biography
Lachaert was born in Ghent and is the son of Flemish politician Patrick Lachaert. He studied law at Ghent University where he was active in the Liberaal Vlaams Studentenverbond (LVSV) and served as national president of the LVSV from 1999 to 2000. After graduating he worked for the Flemish think-tank Liberales before training as a lawyer.

Lachaert became a member of the Flemish Parliament in 2013 to replace Filip Anthuenis who had resigned his seat. In 2014 Belgian federal election, Lachaert became an MP in the Chamber of Representatives for the East Flanders district and subsequently resigned his seat in the Flemish Parliament. He was re-elected in 2019 and became the Open-VLD's faction leader in the Chamber.

In 2020, he challenged Gwendolyn Rutten for leadership of the Open-VLD during a leadership contest and was subsequently elected as party chairman. As party leader, Lachaert has campaigned for more fiscal responsibility and to stop Belgium's phase out of nuclear power.

References

1977 births
Living people
Members of the Belgian Federal Parliament
Open Vlaamse Liberalen en Democraten politicians
21st-century Belgian politicians